The name Gretel has been used for two tropical cyclones in the Australian region.

 Cyclone Gretel (1985) – passed over the Cobourg Peninsula in the Northern Territory.
 Cyclone Gretel (2020) – developed east of Queensland and soon crossed into the South Pacific cyclone region.

See also

 Cyclone Gretelle, a similar name used in the South-West Indian Ocean.

Australian region cyclone set index articles